Rondelle Yearwood (born 21 July 1975) is a Barbadian cricketer. He played in one first-class match for the Barbados cricket team in 1999/00.

See also
 List of Barbadian representative cricketers

References

External links
 

1975 births
Living people
Barbadian cricketers
Barbados cricketers